Pseudepidalea latastii (formerly Bufo latastii; also known as the Ladakh toad) is a species of toad found in the north-western Himalayas of India and Pakistan, where it lives between .

Description
Crown without bony ridges; snout short, blunt; interorbital space narrower than the upper eyelid; tympanum very distinct, half the diameter of the eye. First finger not extending beyond second; toes two-thirds webbed, with double subartieular tubercles; two moderate metatarsal tubercles; a tarsal fold. The tarsometatarsal articulation reaches the tympanum or the hinder border of the eye. Upper parts with irregular, depressed, distinctly porous warts; parotoids moderate, kidney-shaped; a parotoid-like gland on the calf. Olive above, spotted or marbled with blackish; a light vertebral band; beneath more or less spotted or marbled with blackish.

Snout–vent length .

References

Frogs of India
Amphibians of Pakistan
Amphibians described in 1882
Taxobox binomials not recognized by IUCN